JGD may refer to:

 JGD, the IATA code for Jiagedaqi Airport, Heilongjiang Province, China
 JGD, the station code for Greenwood railway station, Perth, Western Australia, Australia